Ryuthela nishihirai is a species of spider in the family Liphistiidae. They thrive on the Japanese islands of Okinawa.

References

Liphistiidae
Spiders of Asia
Chelicerates of Japan
Spiders described in 1979